Ray "Sugar Bear" Hamilton (born January 20, 1951) is a former American football player from 1973 through 1981 for the New England Patriots. He also coached for the Patriots as an assistant defensive line coach in Super Bowl XX. Hamilton got his first shot as a defensive line coach for the National Football League's Atlanta Falcons. Hamilton was an All Big 8 defensive tackle for the Oklahoma Sooners, being named to the first team in 1971 and 1972.

Hamilton is best known for an incident in the 1976 NFL playoffs in a first-round game against the Oakland Raiders, when Oakland's Ken Stabler threw an incompletion after Hamilton tipped the ball as he threw. Stabler fell backwards after little or no contact from Hamilton, and the play would have resulted in a fourth down and 18 yards to go. Ben Dreith, the referee, gave the Raiders a first down on a penalty of roughing the passer. Hamilton later was a defensive line coach for nine NFL teams, including the Patriots and Raiders.

Before becoming the defensive line coach for the Falcons, he spent the previous five years in the same position with the Jacksonville Jaguars. Hamilton spent two seasons as the Defensive Line Coach for the Cleveland Browns from 2001–2002. In his first season with Cleveland, the Browns tied for fourth in the AFC with 43 sacks. For three seasons, Hamilton served as New England Defensive Line Coach from 1997–99 and joined the New York Jets staff in 2000.  His 1998 defensive line tallied 25 of the team 36 sacks, the seventh-best total in the NFL. In 1995, Hamilton joined the Jets in his first stint with the team as the Defensive Line Coach. He guided defensive end Hugh Douglas, who was named the 1995 NFL Defensive Rookie of the Year. From 1993–94, Hamilton was a member of the Los Angeles Raiders where he developed Chester McGlockton and a defensive line that combined for 83 sacks in his two seasons with the Raiders. In 2006, Hamilton guided defensive end Bobby McCray  who developed into one of the AFC top pass rushers as he led Jacksonville with a career-high 10 sacks. The defensive line combined for 29.5 sacks, ranking fourth in the NFL in rushing yards allowed per game.

In 2018, Hamilton became the defensive line coach for the Birmingham Iron of the Alliance of American Football.

References

1951 births
Living people
American football defensive tackles
American football defensive ends
Birmingham Iron coaches
New England Patriots players
New England Patriots coaches
Oklahoma Sooners football players
Jacksonville Jaguars coaches